Frederick Charles Lincoln (5 May 1892 – 16 September 1960) was an American ornithologist.

Early life and family
Lincoln was born on 5 May 1892 in Denver, Colorado.

Career
As a teenager working at the Colorado Museum of Natural History in 1909, Lincoln learned to prepare specimens from Alexander Wetmore (who was then a student working at the museum) and L. J. Hershey, the museum's Curator of Ornithology.  Lincoln's interest in birds continued to develop, and he eventually went on to succeed Hershey as curator in 1913, a post which he held until 1920.  He took time out in 1918–1919 to serve as pigeon expert in the U.S. Army Signal Corps.  The professional relationship with Wetmore would continue: the two scientists took field trips together in Washington and Hispaniola and co-wrote eight publications.

In 1920, Lincoln joined the U.S. Bureau of Biological Survey (at the time, a unit of the United States Department of Agriculture, and now part of the United States Fish and Wildlife Service) and was given the task of organizing and expanding the bird banding program nationwide.  The Migratory Bird Treaty Act of 1918 had established federal responsibility for migratory birds; the result was that the North American Bird Banding Program took the place of earlier smaller-scale efforts by individuals and the short-lived American Bird Banding Association.  During the period of his tenure, 1920–1946, Lincoln was highly influential: he improved methods for trapping and banding, developed record-keeping procedures, recruited banders, fostered international cooperation, and promoted banding as a tool for research and wildlife management.  He proposed a means to estimate the continent-wide population size of a bird species, using reports from hunters and counting "returns" (birds killed that are wearing bands); this metric became known as the Lincoln index.  He developed the flyway concept, a key idea in the management and regulation of hunting of migratory birds.

Lincoln joined the American Ornithologists' Union in 1910 and was elected a Fellow of the organization in 1934.

Later life and death
Lincoln died on 16 September 1960 in Washington, D.C. and was buried in Arlington National Cemetery.

Legacy and recognition
Lincoln received an honorary Doctor of Science degree from the University of Colorado in 1956; in 1957, the Department of the Interior recognized him with its Distinguished Service Award.

Selected publications

References

Bibliography

External links

American ornithologists
1892 births
1960 deaths
Scientists from Denver
20th-century American zoologists